Loch Ewe is a sea loch in the region of Wester Ross in the Northwest Highlands of Scotland. The shores are inhabited by a traditionally Gàidhlig-speaking people living in or sustained by crofting villages, the most notable of which, situated on the north-eastern shore, is the Aultbea settlement.

History
Due to the rugged and inaccessible terrain in which it is located, Loch Ewe has always been an assembly point for maritime trade.  Around 1610 the area at the head of Loch Ewe, today known as Poolewe, was urbanised around an iron furnace using charcoal produced in the surrounding woodlands for fuel. English ironmasters found it more economic to ship the ore to Poolewe for smelting than to ship the processed charcoal to England to run furnaces there.

The crofting villages which were established in the 1840s, as a result of the local parish's estate being reformed from run-rig to fixed holdings properties, were always quite small. Bualnaliub, nine miles (fifteen kilometres) to the north of Poolewe, had eleven houses and fifty people at the 1841 census – twenty-three of whom were from the same (McIver) family. Mellon Charles, four miles (six and a half kilometres) to the west, had two hundred and sixteen people in forty-one houses – including seventeen houses headed by a McLennan. Ormiscaig, roughly halfway between them, had ten houses (four headed by McGregors) totalling forty-eight people. One hundred and forty years later, in 1981, the population was ten at Bualnaluib, twenty-four at Ormiscaig and one hundred and ten at Mellon Charles.

In 1911 a 70-foot lighthouse was built on the promontory between Gairloch and Poolewe.

Loch Ewe was a temporary base of the Home Fleet during the Second World War. It was also used as an assembly point for the Arctic Convoys during the war. Ships from the British, American and other ports gathered here before sailing to Murmansk from September 1942 following the disaster of Convoy PQ 17 in order to confuse German intelligence.

At the German surrender in April 1945 Loch Ewe became the British marshalling point for many of the German U-boats that had surrendered while at sea.

Tournaig 

According to the published correspondence of a local resident, the Royal Navy established watchkeeping defences around an inlet to the south-east of Loch Ewe, sourcing the area for its cod, haddock, and mackerel reserves:

NATO Z-berths and POL depots 
As of 2006, the Mellon Charles base is still in use, with two berths authorised for nuclear-powered submarine use. The jetty at Aultbea is designated a "Z-berth" to allow NATO's nuclear submarines to return for servicing without warning. A second Z-berth is located in the middle of Loch Ewe itself, marked by a buoy but not appearing on any Ordnance Survey maps.

The naval boom defence depot at Mellon Charles marks the start of the original protective netting which guarded the entrance to the loch. Part of the base is designated a petroleum, oil and lubricants (POL) depot. This provides for the maintenance of visiting warships.

Culture
Loch Ewe is often praised for its scenic beauty, especially in the vistas from the so-called midnight walk (the A832 single-track road to the left of Loch Kernsary) about a mile and a half to the north of Tournaig. This is the subject of many strathspeys still sung today in local ceilidh. Additionally, it has several outposts above the Aultbea foreshore (around Aird Point) giving photo opportunities for tourists travelling inland.

Ancient Mariner folklore 
In his compendium of folk and faerie (encounters with the Daoine Sìth race) tales of the mainland, Sir George Douglas records that the ancestral dialogues and mythological apologues of the Scottish peasantry, and the folkish customs employed in recounting them, "still linger in the remote western islands of Barra; where, in the long winter nights, the people would gather in crowds to listen to those whom they considered good exponents of the art. At an earlier date, – but still, at that time [in the mid twentieth century], within living memory, – the custom survived at Poolewe in Ross-shire where the young people were used to assemble  at night to hear the old ones recite the tales which they had learned from their fore-fathers. Here, and at earlier dates in other parts of the country also, the demand for stories would further be supplied by travelling pedlars, or by gaberlunzie men, or pauper wandering musicians and entertainers, or by the itinerant shoemaker or tailor – 'Whip-the-Cat' as he was nicknamed, – both of which last were accustomed to travel through thinly-populated country districts, in the pursuit of their calling, and to put up for the night at farm-houses, – where, whilst plying their needles, they would entertain the company with stories.

"The arrival of one of these story-tellers in a village was an important event. As soon as it became known, there would be a rush to the house where he was lodged, and every available seat – on bench, table, bed, beam, or the floor – would quickly be appropriated. And then, for hours together – just like some first-rate actor on a stage – the story-teller would hold his audience spell-bound. During his recitals, the emotions of the reciter were occasionally very strongly excited, as were also those of his listeners, who at one time would be on the verge of tears, at another give way to laughter. There were many of these listeners, by the way, who believed firmly in all the extravagances narrated.

And such rustic scenes as these, as I [will show], have by no means been without their marked upon Scottish literature."

Dialect 
Ross-shire dialect English is spoken in Red Point (nearby Gairloch) and Poolewe. It is "somewhat similar to that of the Southern Hebridean [Harris and Barra] dialects." Pre-aspiration involves "a very distinct and long h, often with a slight velar friction; though this h is different from x, which has more friction, and there exist such pairs as bohk 'a buck' boc ~bcxk 'poor' bochd. When the occlusive is palatal, h is not affected by the palatality."

References

Scotland Fishery Reserves Services: Loch Ewe Ecosystem Monitoring 
 
Clan Stories: The Russian Convoys
Songs of Wester Ross

External links
 The Gairloch and Loch Ewe Action Forum
 The Poolewe-Little Gruinard walk
 Rèidio dà Locha
 Laxdale Ladies' waulking group competing in the Wester Ross Provincial Mod

Sea lochs of Scotland
Lochs of Highland (council area)